Class EE1 (Electric Express 1) was an electric locomotive commissioned by the North Eastern Railway  in 1922.  Ownership passed to the London and North Eastern Railway in 1923 and to British Railways in 1948.

It was an electrically powered locomotive in the pre-TOPS period.

Overview
In 1919 the North Eastern Railway made plans to electrify its York-Newcastle stretch of the East Coast Main Line and this locomotive was a prototype built for hauling passenger trains. It had an electrically heated boiler to generate steam for train heating.

The wheels were arranged as in a 4-6-4 steam locomotive and the driving wheels were  diameter. Each of the three driving axles was powered by a pair of traction motors. Electric locomotives of this design were common in continental Europe and the United States, but this was the only example on a British railway.

After grouping in 1923 the London and North Eastern Railway dropped the electrification project so (apart from some trials on the Shildon line) the locomotive was never used. It survived into British Railways ownership but was withdrawn in August 1950, and scrapped on 15 December 1950.

In common with other LNER electric locomotives, no classification was given to this locomotive until 4 October 1945, when no. 13 was classified EE1 (Electric Express 1). In May 1946, no. 13 was renumbered to 6999; and under British Railways, it became no. 26600 in 1948.

Specification

 Numbers: (NER) 13; (LNER) 6999; (BR) 26600
 Wheel arrangement: 2-Co-2
 Introduced: 1922
 Builder: North Eastern Railway
 Motors: 6 x , Metropolitan-Vickers
 Total power:  
 Supply: 1,500 V DC overhead

Notes

References

 The NER Electric 2-Co-2 Class EE1 Locomotive No. 13

Electric Express
EE1
1500 V DC locomotives
Individual locomotives of Great Britain
Railway locomotives introduced in 1922
Scrapped locomotives
Unique locomotives
Standard gauge locomotives of Great Britain
EE1
2-Co-2 locomotives
4-6-4 locomotives
2′Co2′ locomotives